
Międzyrzecz County is a unit of territorial administration and local government (powiat) in Lubusz Voivodeship, western Poland. It came into being on January 1, 1999, as a result of the Polish local government reforms passed in 1998.

As of 2019 its total population is 57,851, out of which the population of Międzyrzecz is 17,994, that of Skwierzyna is 9,671, that of Trzciel is 2,391, and the rural population is 27,795.

Neighbouring counties
Międzyrzecz County is bordered by Strzelce-Drezdenko County to the north, Międzychód County to the north-east, Nowy Tomyśl County to the east, Świebodzin County to the south, Sulęcin County to the west and Gorzów County to the north-west.

Administrative division
The county is subdivided into six gminas (three urban-rural and three rural). These are listed in the following table, in descending order of population.

References

External links
Official website of the Międzyrzecz County 
Official website of the county office 

 
Land counties of Lubusz Voivodeship